Chang hen ge may refer to:

Chang hen ge (poem), an 809 Chinese poem by Bai Juyi about the love and death of Yang Yuhuan
The Song of Everlasting Sorrow (novel), a 1995 Chinese novel by Wang Anyi, about a Shanghai woman's life in the 20th century
Everlasting Regret, a 2005 Hong Kong film based on Wang's novel
To Live to Love, a 2006 Chinese TV series based on Wang's novel